The Clergy Letter Project is a project that maintains statements in support of the teaching of evolution  and collects signatures in support of letters from American Christian, Jewish,  Unitarian Universalist, Buddhist, and Humanist clergy. The letters make reference to points raised by intelligent design proponents. There are five separate letters: A Christian Clergy Letter, a Rabbi Letter, a Unitarian Universalist Clergy Letter, a Buddhist Clergy Letter, and a Humanist Clergy Letter. As of October, 2022, there were 15,679 signatures from Christian clergy, 839 signatures from Jewish rabbis, 688 signatures from Unitarian Universalist clergy, 75 signatures from Buddhist clergy, and 58 signatures from Humanist clergy.

This effort was initiated in 2004 by the biologist Michael Zimmerman, past vice president for academic affairs and provost at Evergreen State College in Olympia, Washington. The letter was written by John McFadden, pastor of the First Congregational United Church of Christ in Appleton, Wisconsin.

The project also encourages congregations to participate in Religion and Science Weekend by sponsoring events in which clergy and congregations are encouraged to learn about and discuss the positive intersections of religion and science. The weekend chosen is the closest Sunday to Charles Darwin's birthday, February 12. Evolution Sunday events first took place in 2006 and the project changed from "Sunday" to Weekend" in 2008 to be more inclusive, and in 2022 changed Evolution to Religion and Science. The Clergy Letter Project states that Religion and Science Weekend activities are "an opportunity for serious discussion and reflection on the relationship between religion and science" and in an effort "to elevate the quality of the discussion on this critical topic, and to show that religion and science are not adversaries." The project states that events are specifically intended to emphasize that "Religious people from many diverse faith traditions and locations around the world understand that evolution is quite simply sound science; and for them, it does not in any way threaten, demean, or diminish their faith in God. In fact, for many, the wonders of science often enhance and deepen their awe and gratitude towards God."

Statement
The letters are entitled An Open Letter Concerning Religion and Science. The four letters have somewhat distinct texts.

In addition to English, the Christian version of the project has also been translated to Spanish, Portuguese, and French.

Rabbi Letter

Unitarian Universalist Letter

Buddhist Clergy Letter

Humanist Clergy Letter

History
The project was organized in 2004 by Michael Zimmerman, then a biology professor and dean of the College of Science and Letters at University of Wisconsin–Oshkosh. He was motivated to create a petition by the actions of the school board in Grantsburg, Wisconsin, which had passed some anti-evolution policies in the summer of 2004. Zimmerman was a veteran of similar disputes in Ohio, when he was a professor at Oberlin College. After Zimmerman watched Christian fundamentalist clergy from Dover, Pennsylvania, on the television program Nightline insisting that decisions about teaching evolution in schools was equivalent to a choice between heaven and hell, he recruited the husband of the head of the university Psychology Department, John McFadden, pastor of the First Congregational United Church of Christ in Appleton, Wisconsin, to write a letter describing how science and religion can co-exist.

Zimmerman worked with local clergy in Wisconsin to get clergy to sign this letter, and within a few weeks he had collected almost 200 clergy signatures. The signed letter was delivered to the Grantsburg School Board on December 16, 2004. This effort, together with those of other concerned groups of educators, citizens and scientists, lead the Grantsburg School Board to rescind its policies.

After this success, Zimmerman was encouraged to organize a nationwide campaign and gather more signatures. By September 12, 2005, the Clergy Letter Project had collected more than 7,500 signatures. By the beginning of December 2005, the project had amassed more than 10,000 signatures. Most of the clergy who signed are Protestant, an artifact of the way that people were originally invited to sign the letter. Email invitations were sent; it was easier to get email addresses for some churches and denominations than others.

The clergy letter was at first limited to Christian clergy, and Zimmerman declined offers from Jewish and Muslim clergy. Zimmerman stated that "Since it is fundamentalist Christian ministers who have been shouting to the American people that they must choose between religion and science, it seemed reasonable to have thousands upon thousands of Christian clergy assert otherwise. It simply wouldn't be very persuasive to have leaders of other religions saying to Christians that Christian fundamentalist ministers are not speaking for all Christians...the Clergy Letter Project and Evolution Sunday are not designed to change the minds of fundamentalists. Rather, our goal is to educate the vast majority of Christians who, if told they have to choose between religion and modern science, are likely to opt for religion."

More recently, four additional statements have been added to the project: a Jewish rabbi letter, a Unitarian Universalist clergy letter, a Buddhist clergy letter, and a Humanist clergy letter.

Evolution Weekend and related activities
Zimmerman and the Clergy Letter Project also organize "Evolution Weekend," an annual movement to encourages churches to discuss the role of science and religion in sermons, discussion groups, seminars, and other activities on the weekend nearest to February 12, the birthday of Charles Darwin (Darwin Day). The day began in 2006 as "Evolution Sunday," gaining attention from The New York Times. In 2008, it was renamed "Evolution Weekend" to incorporate more faith traditions. In 2011, 652 congregations from all 50 states and the District of Columbia as well as 13 countries participated in Evolution Weekend activities.

Zimmerman and the Clergy Letter Project maintain a list of 1,052 scientists from all 50 states, the District of Columbia, Puerto Rico, and 32 countries, who have agreed to serve as "technical consultants to clergy members who have questions about the science associated with all aspects of evolution." The project states that "The very existence of this list clearly demonstrates the willingness of scientists to work collaboratively with clergy members. Together, scientists and clergy members demonstrate that religion and science can have a complementary and positive relationship with one another."

Evolution Weekend often gained attention from several news outlets, with participating clergy being interviewed in local publications.

Reaction from creationists
The creationist Discovery Institute, which arranged its own anti-evolution petition called A Scientific Dissent from Darwinism in 2001 criticized the project. Discovery Institute communications director Rob Crowther asserted that the disputes about evolution was "purely a scientific debate" and that clergy petitions are irrelevant, stating that clergy "don't make any difference," since "We don't think there is anything religious at all to the theory of intelligent design." Zimmerman described this argument as part of the problem, as intelligent design tried to undermine science by changing it from a study of the natural world to include supernatural explanations, and it was important for clergy to defend science against these attacks.

Ken Ham and Mark Looy of the creationist organization Answers in Genesis have repeatedly condemned Evolution Sunday/Evolution Weekend activities as a "Darwin praise service" and expressing dismay that "over 10,200 clergy had signed this awful letter." Ham and Looy also criticized Zimmerman's fundraising efforts through the Christian Alliance for Progress. Answers in Genesis published a list of "modern scientists who have accepted the biblical account of creation." The majority are not biologists. The group has also organized "Creation Sunday" in response to Evolution Weekend, and has promoted the Creation Letter Project in response to Clergy Letter Project.

Jonathan Dudley, a divinity student at Yale University and author of the book Broken Words: The Abuse of Science and Faith in American Politics (2011), wrote approvingly of Evolution Sunday in the Yale Daily News on January 24, 2007, while still worrying that congregations were not being taught to think for themselves with this current campaign, any more than subscribing to fundamentalist Christian Biblical literalist doctrines. This caused Discovery Institute fellow Jonathon Wells to write a scathing article in the Yale Daily News about Evolution Sunday, "Darwinism," and Zimmerman. Wells repeated creationist objections to evolution by claiming that there is no evidence of evolution and condemning evolution for not being in agreement with the views of 40% of the American public. Zimmerman responded to Wells' attack with a column in the Yale Daily News pointing out the copious errors of fact in Wells' article. Wells followed this with a letter to the editor in the Yale Daily News. Wells brushed over the points Zimmerman had raised, and focused on whether the word "Darwinism" is appropriate or not. Wells also responded with vigor to two others who had written letters to the editor critical of his original article. Finally, Wells claimed that the only reason to stage Evolution Sunday is because evolution is not "scientifically sound or religiously neutral," and that it is "promoting an anti-religious philosophy disguised as empirical science." University of Iowa faculty member Tara C. Smith noted several other responses to this episode in her blog, Aetiology.

See also
A Scientific Support for Darwinism
Creation and evolution in public education in the United States
Creation–evolution controversy
Level of support for evolution
Project Steve
Theistic evolution

References

Citations

Bibliography

External links
 

2004 establishments in Washington (state)
Criticism of creationism
Criticism of intelligent design
Religion and science
Religious activism
Science activism
Science advocacy organizations